Zhang Kexin (born October 17, 1995) is a Chinese former figure skater. She is the 2014 Chinese national champion.

Career 
Zhang began skating in 2000. Li Mingzhu became her coach in 2008.

Zhang debuted on the ISU Junior Grand Prix (JGP) series in 2009. She won the bronze medal at the 2010 JGP in Japan].

Making her Grand Prix debut, Zhang placed fourth at the 2011 Cup of China. She finished 7th at the 2012 World Championships in Nice, France, giving China two ladies' singles berths for the 2013 event, for the first time since 1997.

In the 2013–14 season, Zhang won silver at the Asian Open Trophy in Bangkok and placed 8th at the Cup of China Grand Prix event in Beijing. She won her first senior national title at the Chinese Championships in Changchun, having finished ahead of Zhao Ziquan. She was chosen to represent China at the 2014 Winter Olympics. Zhang finished 15th in Sochi, Russia, after placing 14th in the short program and 15th in the free skate.

Programs

Competitive highlights
GP: Grand Prix; JGP: Junior Grand Prix

Detailed results

 QR = Qualifying round; SP = Short program; FS = Free skating

References

External links 

 

1995 births
Living people
Chinese female single skaters
Figure skaters from Harbin
Figure skaters at the 2014 Winter Olympics
Olympic figure skaters of China
Figure skaters at the 2011 Asian Winter Games